Pleuronodes is a genus of moths of the family Erebidae. The genus was erected by George Hampson in 1926.

Species
Pleuronodes arida Hampson, 1902
Pleuronodes lepticyma Hampson, 1909
Pleuronodes odorino Bryk, 1915
Pleuronodes plexifera Hampson, 1926
Pleuronodes trogopera Hampson, 1910

References

Calpinae